Gol Soleymanabad (also Romanized as Gol Soleymānābād) is a village in Baruq Rural District of the Central District of Baruq County, West Azerbaijan province, Iran. At the 2006 National Census, its population was 2,923 in 699 households, when it was in Baruq District of Miandoab County. The following census in 2011 counted 3,333 people in 937 households. The latest census in 2016 showed a population of 3,436 people in 1,008 households; it was the largest village in its rural district. After the census, Baruq District was separated from Miandoab County, elevated to the status of a county, and divided into two districts.

References 

Populated places in West Azerbaijan Province